Andrew Phillips (born 17 April 1962) is a Jamaican swimmer. He competed in four events at the 1984 Summer Olympics.

References

External links
 

1962 births
Living people
Jamaican male swimmers
Olympic swimmers of Jamaica
Swimmers at the 1984 Summer Olympics
Commonwealth Games competitors for Jamaica
Swimmers at the 1978 Commonwealth Games
Pan American Games competitors for Jamaica
Swimmers at the 1979 Pan American Games
Place of birth missing (living people)
20th-century Jamaican people
21st-century Jamaican people